Hällaryd is a locality in Karlshamn Municipality, Blekinge County, Sweden with 546 inhabitants in 2010. It is between Karlshamn and Ronneby, featuring the archipelago south of Matvik with Tärnö as its far out landmark.

References 

Populated places in Karlshamn Municipality